David Helpling is a California based guitarist and keyboardist, recording artist and film composer specializing in  ambient music and electronic music. He started his solo career with Between Green and Blue and Sleeping On The Edge Of The World. After composing the soundtrack to the film Trade Offs in 2003 Helpling released four albums, collaborating with fellow ambient recording artist Jon Jenkins, before releasing several solo tracks and three new solo albums: A Sea Without Memory (made exclusively with electric guitars, 2018), Rune (2019), and IN (2022).

Musical career
Helpling is a self-taught musician, whose debut release, Between Green and Blue, was a finalist for the 1997 INDIE Album-Of-The-Year award. In 1999, Helpling released his second album, Sleeping on the Edge of the World. Among other musical influences such as U2 and Björk, one of Helpling's main inspirations is film music. Elliot Goldenthal, Edward Shearmur and David Julyan are among his favorites. As a full-time composer, Helpling has written music for several films, one of which, Trade Offs, immersed him in the music of India. The score features several guest artists, including vocalist Nidhi Bhatmuley, who also performs on his 2022 album, IN. Other film assignments include Cold Storage (2009), directed by Tony Elwood, for which Helpling scored a fully orchestral soundtrack using only computers.

Collaboration
Helpling and Jon Jenkins initially became a working partnership after being contacted by filmmaker Chris Cumming via Helpling's record company Spotted Peccary.  After working on the score to Cumming's film "False Summit" the pair discovered they had a mutual respect for and interest in each other's music.  Starting with Treasure the two worked as true collaborators; both contributing equally to composing, arranging the tracks and engineering the recordings. This collaboration continued as the two embarked on completing two follow-up albums, The Crossing and Found winning the 2013 ZMR Music Award for Best Electronic Album;, the three albums constituting a sonic trilogy. He continued his collaboration with Indian musicians on the album IN (2022), which involves vocalist Nidhi Bhatmuley and esraj player Benjy Wertheimer. Loop cellist Matthew Schoening also features on the album.

Film composition
Helpling is also a composer for film, and has also provided several themes, scores, and ambient beds for numerous television, corporate, and interactive projects. His production company is named DHM Music Design.

Other projects
"As the World Falls Away" is a  time-lapse video filmed and produced by Shawn Malone and set to Helpling's music. According to WILX, it "went viral" in 2014.

The video "North Country Dreamland", shot and produced by Malone, was set to "Lifted" from the album The Crossing.

The video "Radiance", shot and produced by Malone, was set to Helping's music.

The animated video "You Already Are", produced by Joe Abreu, was set to the track of the same name from the album IN.

Discography

Compilations

See also 
List of ambient music artists

References

External links
 

1969 births
Living people
People from Chula Vista, California
Musicians from California
American film score composers
20th-century American composers
21st-century American composers
American male film score composers
20th-century American male musicians
21st-century American male musicians